Willetton is a large southern suburb of Perth, Western Australia. Its local government area is the City of Canning.

History
Willetton's name derives from Henry Willett of Willett & Co, who was granted Canning Location 21 (roughly the location of modern Lynwood and Parkwood) and settled in the area in June 1832. In November 1964, the Shire of Canning proposed the names "Burtsdale" and "Willetton" for Willetton and Lynwood/Parkwood respectively, the name Burtsdale honouring Septimus Burt, who purchased the land in 1882. In August 1965, developers at Lynwood requested the name "Clovercrest Estate", but finally agreed to "Lynwood". The name Willetton was shifted westwards and gazetted in December 1965 within its present boundaries.

The original subdivision was opened in the early 1970s under the developer's name "Burrendah Heights". This name survives as Burrendah Boulevard and Burrendah Primary School. The section to the east of Vahland Avenue and north of Collins Road was developed in the 1980s under the unofficial name "Rostrata", from which Rostrata Primary School gets its name. Most housing and infrastructure was completed in the 1990s.

Geography

It is built on a section of flat sandy coastal plain that was originally covered with open Banksia woodland and stands of paperbark trees marking the edges of shallow seasonal swamps.

Willetton is bounded by Karel Avenue to the west, Leach Highway and High Road to the north, Willeri Drive to the east and South Street and Roe Highway to the south. Vahland Avenue runs north-south through the suburb.

At the 2001 Australian census, Willetton had a mostly average-income population of 17,571 people living in 6,300 dwellings, nearly all of which are detached houses on single lots. The Australian Bureau of Statistics reported that almost 20% of the suburb's population were of East, Southeast or South Asian origin. Retail trade (1,515), property and business services (1,118), manufacturing (944), education (911), and health and community services (904) were the key occupations of Willetton's residents.

Facilities
Willetton contains the Southlands Boulevarde shopping centre, with two levels and businesses including two supermarkets, Hoyts cinemas and a food court. Opposite the shopping centre across Burrendah Boulevard is the Willetton Sports and Community Centre. A light industrial area exists in the north of the suburb near Leach Highway and High Road, containing a Bunnings, pool shops and various trades. Three small neighbourhood shopping centres offer local services in the corners of the suburb.

Adjacent to Willetton on High Road, the Riverton Leisureplex, a large facility with sporting, fitness and recreation facilities opened on 9 November 2001, is operated by the City of Canning, and includes the council's largest library. The Willetton Library is located near Southlands Boulevarde.

Transport
Willetton is situated between two major east-west routesLeach Highway (west to the Bull Creek railway station, Kwinana Freeway to Perth's central business district and Fremantle; east to Cannington and Perth Airport) and South Street (west to Murdoch railway station, Murdoch University and Fremantle; east to Canning Vale and Armadale). Roe Highway is on the southeastern fringe of the suburb, while Karel Avenue (to Jandakot Airport), Vahland Avenue and Willeri Drive are major north-south routes.

Willetton contains the Southlands bus station, where the CircleRoute takes passengers to Murdoch railway station, Murdoch University and Curtin University, while other bus routes go to Cannington. All services are operated by the Public Transport Authority.

Politics

Historically it has been fairly safe for the Liberal Party at both Federal and state elections, although three of the suburb's four booths delivered majorities to the Labor Party at state level in 2001 and 2005. In 2008 it returned a Liberal member to parliament by a very slim majority. By the 2017 state election, despite the Liberal Party winning only 13 of 59 seats, the Liberal Party won all four booths in Willetton. In the 2022 Australian federal election, Labor won First Preference in all six booths in Willetton and Two Candidate Preferred in five of the six booths, in line with an overall nationwide shift to Labor.

The suburb is located within the federal Division of Tangney, the state seat of Riverton and the Beeliar ward of the City of Canning.

References

External links
Willetton Reserve Pavilion
Willetton Sports and Community Centre
 

Suburbs of Perth, Western Australia
Suburbs in the City of Canning